Hilmi bin Yahaya (born 6 March 1948) is a Malaysian politician who served as Deputy Minister of Health from 2013 to 2018. He is a member of the United Malays National Organisation (UMNO), a component party of the Barisan Nasional (BN) coalition.

Election results

Honours
  :
  Companion of the Order of the Defender of State (DMPN) – Dato' (1996)
  Commander of the Order of the Defender of State (DGPN) - Dato' Seri (2004)

References 

Living people
1948 births
People from Penang
Malaysian people of Malay descent
Malaysian Muslims
United Malays National Organisation politicians
Members of the Dewan Rakyat